The Late Shift is a 1996 American made-for-television biographical film directed by Betty Thomas, and written by George Armitage and New York Times media reporter Bill Carter. Released by HBO Pictures and produced in conjunction with Northern Lights Entertainment, the film premiered on HBO on February 24, 1996.

Based on Carter's 1994 book of the same name, the film chronicles the late-night television conflict between Jay Leno and David Letterman in the early 1990s, surrounding NBC's appointment of Leno to succeed Johnny Carson as host of The Tonight Show, and Late Night host Letterman's resulting efforts to negotiate out of his contract with the network to host his own competing talk show for CBS.

Plot
In 1991, behind-the-scenes network politics embroil television executives responsible for NBC's late-night programming. Johnny Carson has hosted The Tonight Show since 1962, but he and his audience are both growing older, leaving NBC to anticipate the day when a new host will be needed. Carson's then-permanent guest host, Jay Leno, and the host of the show that follows Carson's each night, David Letterman, both vie for Carson's job. It is widely assumed that Letterman is the hand-picked heir apparent whom Carson favors, but NBC executives privately speculate that Leno could be more popular with audiences in the 11:30 p.m. (ET/PT)/10:30 p.m. (CT/MT) slot, as well as easier for the network to control. They also would not have to deal with Letterman's stipulation for ownership rights to the show (which applied to his Late Night program).

Leno's manager, Helen Kushnick, secures the spot for Leno with negotiating tactics that could be construed as either shrewd or unethical. Leno is concerned that her methods might alienate Carson, but does not wish to be disloyal as he believes that she has been responsible for his success; in addition, he had promised to take care of her after her husband's death. Kushnick harshly instructs Leno to just keep telling jokes and leave the business end to her. Surely enough, Kushnick secures the producer's position for herself at The Tonight Show, on the condition that no public announcement will be made. Letterman continues to believe he is still in contention for the position.

In the spring of 1991, Carson unexpectedly announces his retirement, effective the next year. NBC executives inform an angry Letterman they have selected Leno to replace Carson. Leno takes over on May 25, 1992, but Kushnick's bullying manner angers his colleagues, potential guests, and others to the point of interfering with network airtime and relationships. NBC executives warn the mild-mannered Leno that they are going to fire Kushnick and, if he sides with her, he will be let go as well. Kushnick is dismissed by NBC and barred from the studio lot. Despite Kushnick's pleas to keep his promise to take care of her and her daughter, Leno is angry because she nearly cost him a dream job. After a heated argument, Leno fires Kushnick and ends their friendship. Later, Leno eavesdrops on an executive meeting in which NBC executives discuss the possibility of replacing him with Letterman.

Letterman, devastated at being passed over, hires Hollywood superagent Michael Ovitz to negotiate on his behalf; Ovitz promises that not only will Letterman be offered an 11:30 p.m. show, he will be offered it by every network. True to Ovitz's word, Letterman is courted by all the major networks and syndicates. He provisionally accepts an offer from CBS that gives him an 11:30 p.m show, but continues to hold on to his lifelong dream of hosting The Tonight Show. Per Letterman's contract with NBC, the network still has several months to either match CBS's offer or present an acceptable counteroffer to keep Letterman. Producer Peter Lassally, close to both Carson and Letterman, finally convinces NBC to offer Letterman the Tonight Show position. However, NBC's offer is substantially weaker than CBS's and would force Letterman to wait until May 1994 to take over the show. Lassally, disappointed at NBC's offer, makes it clear to Letterman that the Tonight Show job is now "damaged goods" and Dave would be working with the very people who passed him over and may yet double-cross him. In addition, Lassally warns Letterman that he will be vilified in the press for forcing Leno out.

Taking Lassally's suggestion, Letterman calls Carson to ask for advice; Carson says he would probably leave NBC if he were in Letterman's position. Letterman rejects NBC's counteroffer and accepts CBS's offer to host Late Show with David Letterman his own 11:30 show (to be called the Late Show with David Letterman) beginning on August 30, 1993. Letterman and Leno ultimately go head to head at 11:30, with Letterman initially winning in the TV ratings in the beginning, before Leno firmly re-establishes The Tonight Shows dominance.

Cast
 Kathy Bates as Helen Kushnick
 John Michael Higgins as David Letterman
 Daniel Roebuck as Jay Leno
 Bob Balaban as Warren Littlefield
 Ed Begley, Jr. as Rod Perth
 Peter Jurasik as Howard Stringer
 Reni Santoni as John Agoglia
 John Kapelos as Robert Morton
 Steven Gilborn as Peter Lassally
 John Getz as Brandon Tartikoff
 Lawrence Pressman as Bob Wright
 Sandra Bernhard as Herself
 Treat Williams as Michael Ovitz
 Paul Elder as Rupert Murdoch
 Michael Fairman as Michael Gartner
 Ken Kragen as Himself
 Aaron Lustig as Paul Shaffer
 Kevin Scannell as Dick Ebersol
 Edmund L. Shaff as Jack Welch
 Kerry Noonan as Letterman's girlfriend 
 Rich Little as Johnny Carson
 Little Richard as Himself
 Nicholas Guest as Bob Iger 
 Penny Peyser as Susan Binford 
 Lucinda Jenney as Debbie Vickers 
 Arthur Taxier as Lee Gabler

Real-life CBS executive Rod Perth (played by Ed Begley Jr. in the film) appears briefly in a cameo role. (He is the person Howard Stringer mistakes for Perth in the CAA lobby). Actor Ed Begley Jr. and Rod Perth share an extraordinary physical resemblance, something the film makers milk for humor in the scene.

Reception

The film received seven Emmy Award nominations in categories including "Outstanding Made for Television Movie," makeup, casting, writing, directing, and acting. For her role in the film as Helen Kushnick, actress Kathy Bates won awards from the American Comedy Awards, the Golden Globe Awards, the Satellite Awards, and the Screen Actors Guild Awards. The film was also recognized with an award for "Outstanding Directorial Achievement in Dramatic Specials" from the Directors Guild of America Awards. However, David Letterman, who saw clips of the film, called the movie "the biggest waste of film since my wedding photos." He also likened John Michael Higgins’ version of him to a "circus chimp" and “budding psychotic.”  During production, Letterman invited Higgins onto his program, but Higgins declined. Following the film’s release, Higgins accepted a booking on the show only to be bumped by Dave.

Awards

Lawsuit
Kushnick filed a $30 million lawsuit against Bill Carter, author of the eponymous book upon which the HBO film was based, claiming libel. Specifically, her case related to a claim that she planted a story about Carson's retirement in the New York Post. The then-pending lawsuit was noted in the film's epilogue, as the Broadway tune "There's No Business Like Show Business" plays. The lawsuit settled out of court for an undisclosed sum; Kushnick died of cancer in August 1996.

Sequel
On January 19, 2010, during Conan O'Brien's final week as host of "The Tonight Show," guest Quentin Tarantino jokingly suggested he direct a sequel to The Late Shift, cast O'Brien as himself and make it a revenge movie in the style of his film Kill Bill with the title Late Shift 2: The Rolling Thunder of Revenge. The Toronto Star reported in February 2010 that a sequel to The Late Shift film was in planning stages. In the final episode of The Tonight Show with Conan O'Brien, O'Brien said that he wished actress Tilda Swinton could portray him in a film version of The Tonight Show conflict, referring to a running gag about their similar appearance. Swinton subsequently expressed interest in being cast as Conan O'Brien in a sequel to The Late Shift.

When asked in a June 2010 Movieline interview if there was going to be a film adaptation of The War for Late Night, Carter responded that plans were not serious at that point, stating, "Not really. Nothing serious. Let’s put it this way: There have always been people kicking it around because they think it’s funny. ... Letterman made a ... joke saying that Max von Sydow should play him. So, you know, people are just kicking it around like that." Actor Bob Balaban, who portrayed NBC executive Warren Littlefield in the film The Late Shift, said he wanted to portray Jeff Zucker, saying that actor Jason Alexander would also be a good choice for the part.

References

Further reading
 
 
 
Lawsuit
 Helen Gorman Kushnick v. Disney Book Publishing, Inc., et al. (1994) Los Angeles Superior Court

External links
 

David Letterman
HBO Films films
Films based on non-fiction books
1996 television films
1996 films
American business films
American comedy-drama television films
American docudrama films
1990s business films
1992 Tonight Show conflict
Films directed by Betty Thomas
1990s English-language films
Jay Leno
Films about television
Works about public relations
Films scored by Ira Newborn
Films set in 1991
Films set in 1992
Films set in 1993
Films set in New York City
Films produced by Don Carmody
Cultural depictions of Rupert Murdoch
1990s American films